Salib may refer to:

Salib (in Arabic صليب), the Arabic and Maltese term for the Christian Cross
Abd al-Masih Salib al-Masudi (1848–1935), Egyptian monk and author
Salib tal-Għolja or Laferla Cross, an early 20th-century religious landmark on the outskirts of Siggiewi, in Malta

Places
Deir al-Salib, a village in northern Syria, administratively part of the Hama Governorate
Hawir al-Salib, a Syrian village located in the Subdistrict of the Hama District in the Hama Governorate
Salib al-Turkman, a town in northwestern Syria, administratively part of the Latakia Governorate, located north of Latakia
Wadi Salib (Arabic: lit. Valley of the Cross), a neighbourhood located in the heart of Downtown Haifa, Israel

See also
Saliba (disambiguation)
Salibi, a surname
Saliby (disambiguation)